Albert Robert "Toots" Holway (September 24, 1902 – November 20, 1968) was a Canadian ice hockey defenceman who played 5 seasons in the National Hockey League for the Toronto St. Pats, Montreal Maroons and the Pittsburgh Pirates between 1923 and 1929. The rest of his career, which lasted from 1923 to 1937, was spent in different minor leagues.

His name was engraved on the Stanley Cup with Montreal Maroons in 1926.

Career statistics

Regular season and playoffs

References

External links
 

1902 births
1968 deaths
Canadian ice hockey defencemen
Cleveland Barons (1937–1973) players
Cleveland Falcons players
London Panthers players
Montreal Maroons players
Pittsburgh Pirates (NHL) players
Seattle Seahawks (ice hockey) players
Ice hockey people from Toronto
Stanley Cup champions
Stratford Nationals players
Toronto St. Pats players